In linguistics, a mass noun, uncountable noun, non-count noun, uncount noun, or just uncountable, is a noun with the syntactic property that any quantity of it is treated as an undifferentiated unit, rather than as something with discrete elements. Non-count nouns are distinguished from count nouns.

Given that different languages have different grammatical features, the actual test for which nouns are mass nouns may vary between languages. In English, mass nouns are characterized by the impossibility of being directly modified by a numeral without specifying a unit of measurement and by the impossibility of being combined with an indefinite article (a or an). Thus, the mass noun "water" is quantified as "20 litres of water" while the count noun "chair" is quantified as "20 chairs". However, both mass and count nouns can be quantified in relative terms without unit specification (e.g., "so much water", "so many chairs").

Mass nouns have no concept of singular and plural, although in English they take singular verb forms.  However, many mass nouns in English can be converted to count nouns, which can then be used in the plural to denote (for instance) more than one instance or variety of a certain sort of entity – for example, "Many cleaning agents today are technically not soaps [i.e. types of soap], but detergents," or "I drank about three beers [i.e. bottles or glasses of beer]".

Some nouns can be used indifferently as mass or count nouns, e.g., three cabbages or three heads of cabbage; three ropes or three lengths of rope. Some have different senses as mass and count nouns: paper is a mass noun as a material (three reams of paper, one sheet of paper), but a count noun as a unit of writing ("the students passed in their papers").

Grammatical number and physical discreteness

In English (and in many other languages), there is a tendency for nouns referring to liquids (water, juice), powders (sugar, sand), or substances (metal, wood) to be used in mass syntax, and for nouns referring to objects or people to be count nouns. But there are many exceptions: the mass/count distinction is a property of the terms, not their referents. For example, the same set of chairs can be referred to as "seven chairs" (count) and as "furniture" (mass); the Middle English mass noun pease has become the count noun pea by morphological reanalysis; "vegetables" are a plural count form, while the British English slang synonym "veg" is a mass noun.

In languages that have a partitive case, the distinction is explicit and mandatory. For example, in Finnish, join vettä, "I drank (some) water", the word vesi, "water", is in the partitive case. The related sentence join veden, "I drank (the) water", using the accusative case instead, assumes that there was a specific countable portion of water that was completely drunk.

The work of logicians like Godehard Link and Manfred Krifka established that the mass/count distinction can be given a precise, mathematical definition in terms of quantization and cumulativity.

Cumulativity and mass nouns

An expression P has cumulative reference if and only if for any X and Y:
If X can be described as P and Y can be described as P, as well, then the sum of X and Y can also be described as P.
In more formal terms (Krifka 1998):

which may be read as: X is cumulative if there exists at least one pair x,y, where x and y are distinct, and both have the property X, and if for all possible pairs x and y fitting that description, X is a property of the sum of x and y.

Consider, for example cutlery: If one collection of cutlery is combined with another, we still have "cutlery." Similarly, if water is added to water, we still have "water." But if a chair is added to another, we don't have "a chair," but rather two chairs. Thus the nouns "cutlery" and "water" have cumulative reference, while the expression "a chair" does not. The expression "chairs", however, does, suggesting that the generalization is not actually specific to the mass-count distinction. As many have noted, it is possible to provide an alternative analysis, by which mass nouns and plural count nouns are assigned a similar semantics, as distinct from that of singular count nouns.

An expression P has quantized reference if and only if, for any X:
If X can be described as P, then no proper part of X can be described as P.
This can be seen to hold in the case of the noun house: no proper part of a house, for example the bathroom, or the entrance door, is itself a house. Similarly, no proper part of a man, say his index finger, or his knee, can be described as a man. Hence, house and man have quantized reference.  However, collections of cutlery do have proper parts that can themselves be described as cutlery. Hence cutlery does not have quantized reference. Notice again that this is probably not a fact about mass-count syntax, but about prototypical examples, since many singular count nouns have referents whose proper parts can be described by the same term. Examples include divisible count nouns like "rope", "string", "stone", "tile", etc.

Some expressions are neither quantized nor cumulative. Examples of this include  collective nouns like committee. A committee may well contain a proper part which is itself a committee.  Hence this expression isn't quantized.  It isn't cumulative, either: the sum of two separate committees isn't necessarily a committee.  In terms of the mass/count distinction, committee behaves like a count noun. By some accounts, these examples are taken to indicate that the best characterization of mass nouns is that they are cumulative nouns. On such accounts, count nouns should then be characterized as non-cumulative nouns: this characterization correctly groups committee together with the count nouns. If, instead, we had chosen to characterize count nouns as quantized nouns, and mass nouns as non-quantized ones, then we would (incorrectly) be led to expect committee to be a mass noun. However, as noted above, such a characterization fails to explain many central phenomena of the mass-count distinction.

Multiple senses for one noun
Many English nouns can be used in either mass or count syntax, and in these cases, they take on cumulative reference when used as mass nouns. For example, one may say that "there's apple in this sauce," and then apple has cumulative reference, and, hence, is used as a mass noun. The names of animals, such as "chicken", "fox" or "lamb" are count when referring to the animals themselves, but are mass when referring to their meat, fur, or other substances produced by them. (e.g., "I'm cooking chicken tonight" or "This coat is made of fox.") Conversely, "fire" is frequently used as a  mass noun, but "a fire" refers to a discrete entity. Substance terms like "water" which are frequently used as mass nouns, can be used as count nouns to denote arbitrary units of a substance ("Two waters, please") or of several types/varieties ("waters of the world"). One may say that mass nouns that are used as count nouns are "countified" and that count ones that are used as mass nouns are "massified". However, this may confuse syntax and semantics, by presupposing that words which denote substances are mass nouns by default. According to many accounts, nouns do not have a lexical specification for mass-count status, and instead are specified as such only when used in a sentence. Nouns differ in the extent to which they can be used flexibly, depending largely on their meanings and the context of use. For example, the count noun "house" is difficult to use as mass (though clearly possible), and the mass noun "cutlery" is most frequently used as mass, despite the fact that it denotes objects, and has count equivalents in other languages:

 Incorrect: *There is house on the road. (Incorrect even if a catastrophe is considered)
 Incorrect: *There is a cutlery on the table. (Incorrect even if just one fork is on the table)
 Correct: You got a lot of house for your money since the recession.
 Correct: Spanish cutlery is my favorite. (type / kind reading)

In some languages, such as Chinese and Japanese, it has been claimed by some that all nouns are effectively mass nouns, requiring a measure word to be quantified.

Quantification
Some quantifiers are specific to mass nouns (e.g., an amount of) or count nouns (e.g., a number of, every). Others can be used with both types (e.g., a lot of, some).

Words fewer and less

Where much and little qualify mass nouns, many and few have an analogous function for count nouns:
 How much damage? —Very little.
 How many mistakes? —Very few.

Whereas more and most are the comparative and superlative of both much and many, few and little have differing comparative and superlative (fewer, fewest and less, least).  However, suppletive use of less and least with count nouns is common in many contexts, some of which attract criticism as nonstandard or low-prestige. This criticism dates back to at least 1770; the usage dates back to Old English. In 2008, Tesco changed supermarket checkout signs reading "Ten items or less" after complaints that it was bad grammar; at the suggestion of the Plain English Campaign it switched to "Up to ten items" rather than to "Ten items or fewer".

Conflation of collective noun and mass noun

There is often confusion about the two different concepts of collective noun and mass noun. Generally, collective nouns such as group, family, and committee are not mass nouns but are rather a special subset of count nouns. However, the term "collective noun" is often used to mean "mass noun" (even in some dictionaries) because users conflate two different kinds of verb number invariability: (a) that seen with mass nouns such as "water" or "furniture", with which only singular verb forms are used because the constituent matter is grammatically nondiscrete (although it may ["water"] or may not ["furniture"] be etically nondiscrete); and (b) that seen with collective nouns, which is the result of the metonymical shift between the group and its (both grammatically and etically) discrete constituents.

Some words, including "mathematics" and "physics", have developed true mass-noun senses despite having grown from count-noun roots.

See also
 Plurale tantum

References

External links
 The Mavens Word of the Day: less/fewer
 Semantic Archives: Mass nouns, count nouns and non-count nouns
 F.J. Pelletier L.K. Schubert (2001) Mass Expressions in D. Gabbay & F. Guenthner (eds) Handbook of Philosophical Logic, Vol. 10
 D. Nicolas (2008) Mass nouns and plural logic. Linguistics and Philosophy 31.2, pp. 211–244
 Conceptual Categories and Linguistic Categories VIII: Nouns and Individuation by Beth Levin at web.stanford.edu

Nouns by type
Grammatical number
Syntax–semantics interface